is a Japanese former breaststroke swimmer. She competed in three events at the 1972 Summer Olympics.

References

External links
 

1958 births
Living people
Japanese female breaststroke swimmers
Olympic swimmers of Japan
Swimmers at the 1972 Summer Olympics
Place of birth missing (living people)
Swimmers at the 1974 Asian Games
Asian Games medalists in swimming
Asian Games silver medalists for Japan
Medalists at the 1974 Asian Games